Lorinčík is a borough (city ward) of Košice, Slovakia. It is one of the westernmost boroughs of Košice and retains its traditionally rural character.

History 

The first written records of Lorinčík date as far back as 1248, when the local area and settlement was known as Gord. The settlement and its name had fallen out of use by the early 16th century, with the name Lorinčík replacing it since the 16th century. The name of the village originated from the chapel, which was dedicated to Saint Lawrence. In the 18th century, Lorinčík was possibly abandoned, as it's missing from most records from the period, though it reemerges again as a settled place by 1808. In the mid-1800s, it's noted as a mostly Slovak village. Lorinčík became a borough of Košice in the 20th century and has had its own municipal government since 1991.

The current Church of St Lawrence in the borough, a protected landmark, was built in 1932. However, the patronage of St Lawrence for the locality dates back to at least the early modern period, when an older chapel or church dedicated to St Lawrence already stood in the area. The etymology of Lorinčík (derived from "Lawrence") seems to be based on the traditional use of this specific patron saint in the former village. The borough's current official name in Hungarian is Szentlőrincke ("Little St. Lawrence") and its historical Hungarian name was Lőrincke.

Evolution of the borough's name 

 1406 – Zenthlewrench
 1426 – predium Zenthlewryncz alio nomine Felgard
 1427 – predium Zenthlewrincz alio nomine Felgard
 1553 – Zenthlorincz
 1808 – Lořinčík, Lořinček (Slovak) Lőrinczke (Hungarian)
 18631895 – Lőrincke
 18981913, 19381945 Szentlőrincke
 1906 – slovensky: Ľorinčík
 19201938, 1945 – Lorinčík

Statistics
 Area: 
 Population: 888 (31 December 2020) 
 Population density: 298/km² (31 December 2020) 
 District: Košice II
 Mayor: Damián Exner (as of 2018 elections)

Gallery

References

External links

 Official website of the Lorinčík borough 
 Article on the Lorinčík borough at Cassovia.sk
 Official website of Košice

Boroughs of Košice
Villages in Slovakia merged with towns